Kværner may refer to:

Kværner, a former Norwegian heavy industry company
Aker Solutions, formerly known as Aker Kværner
Kværner, Norway, a neighborhood in Oslo
Kværnerbyen, a neighborhood in Oslo
Kværner Station on the Gjøvik Line